This list of governors of Niigata Prefecture provides a chronological list of the governors of Niigata Prefecture.

List of governors
Tokiatsu Hirimatsu 1871-1872
Masataka Kusumoto 1872–1875
Moriki Nagayama 1875-1885
Shinozaki Goro 1885-1889
Sadaaki Senda 1889–1891
Koteda Yasuda 1891-1896
Asada Tokunori 1896–1897
Minoru Katsumata 1897-1900
Shin Kiyoshi 1900
Fumi Kashiwada 1900-1903
Hiroshi Abe 1903-1907
Kiyoshi Honba 1907-1912
Mori Masataka 1912
Izawa Takio 1912-1913
Ando Kensuke 1913-1914
Keisuke Sakanaka 1914-1916
Tsuizui Katagawa 1916-1917
Watanabe Katsusaburo 1917-1919
Ōta Masahiro 1919–1923
Ohara Sanarata 1923-1925
Takeo Mimatsu 1925-1927
Shohei Fujinoma 1927-1928
Yuichiro Chikaraishi 1928
Ozaki Yujiro 1928-1929
Takeo Mimatsu (2nd time) 1929-1930
Shinya Kurosaki 1930-1931
Nakano Kunikazu 1931
Obata Toyoji 1931-1932
Ryo Chiba 1932-1935
Miyawaki Umekichi 1935-1936
Sekiya Nobuyuki 1936-1938
Yasujiro Nakamura 1938-1939
Seikichi Kimishima 1939-1940
Seiichiro Yasui 1940-1941
Doi Shohei 1941-1943
Tamon Maeda 1943–1945
Kingo Machimura 1945
Masafuku Hatada 1945–1946
Sato Dodai 1946
Hideo Aoki 1946-1947
Shohei Okada 1947-1955
Kazuo Kitamura 1955-1961
Juichiro Tsukada 1961-1966
Shiro Watari 1966-1974
Takeo Kimi 1974-1989
Kiyoshi Kaneko 1989-1992
Ikuo Hirayama 1992–2004
Hirohiko Izumida 2004–2016
Ryuichi Yoneyama 2016–2018
Hideyo Hanazumi 2018-

References 

 
Niigata Prefecture